The Eros School Building is a historic school building in the small rural community of Eros, Arkansas, at the junction of Arkansas Highway 125 and Marion County Road 4018.  It is a single-story Plain Tradition stone structure, with a Craftsman-style side-gable roof with exposed rafter tails.  A gable-topped porch projects from the main (west-facing), supported by slender columns on a concrete base.  The porch pediment, like those on the sides, is stuccoed.  The school was built in 1935 as part of a Depression-era jobs program.

The building was listed on the National Register of Historic Places in 1992.

See also
National Register of Historic Places listings in Marion County, Arkansas

References

School buildings on the National Register of Historic Places in Arkansas
Schools in Marion County, Arkansas
National Register of Historic Places in Marion County, Arkansas
1935 establishments in Arkansas
School buildings completed in 1935
Bungalow architecture in Arkansas
American Craftsman architecture in Arkansas
New Deal in Arkansas